The 1981 Australian Drivers' Championship was a CAMS sanctioned Australian motor racing title open to racing cars complying with Australian Formula 1. It was the 25th Australian Drivers' Championship. The title winner, Alfredo Costanzo was awarded the 1981 CAMS "Gold Star".

Schedule
The championship was contested over a two-round series.

Classes
Car competed in two classes: 
 Up to 1600cc 
 Over 1600cc

Points system
Championship points were awarded at each round on a 9-6-4-3-2-1 basis to the first six finishers in each class. Additional points were awarded at each round on a 4-3-2-1 basis to the first four finishers outright, regardless of class.											
											
Where rounds were contested over more than one heat, round placings were determined by allocating points to the first 14 placegetters in each heat on a 20-16-13-11-10-9-8-7-6-5-4-3-2-1 basis and then aggregating these points. Where more than one driver earned the same number of points the relevant round placing was awarded to the driver who was higher placed in the last heat.

Championship results

Championship name
The conditions for the 1981 championship were published by CAMS under the name "Australian Formula 1 Championship". Australian Motor Racing Year 1981/82 uses both Australian Drivers Championship and Australian Formula One Championship in its review of the series. Racing Car News, January 1982 uses Australian Drivers Championship. CAMS uses Australian Drivers' Championship in its historical records and that has been followed here.

References

Australian Drivers' Championship
Drivers' Championship